The 1998–99 National Football League, also known as the Coca-Cola National Football League for sponsorship reasons, was the third season of National Football League, the top Indian league for association football clubs, since its inception in 1996.

Overview
It was contested by 12 teams, and Salgaocar won the championship. Kingfisher East Bengal came second and Churchill Brothers came third.

First stage

Group A

Group B

Second stage

References

External links 
 Philips National League at Rec.Sport.Soccer Statistics Foundation

National Football League (India) seasons
1998–99 in Indian football
India